Ünyespor is a sports club located in Ünye, a district in Ordu, Turkey. The club plays its games at the Ünye İlçe Stadium. The club was founded as "Ünye Gençlerbirliği" in 1957 and took the Ünyespor name in 1985.

In 2015 Ünyespor and Ünye Belediyespor merged to become Ünye 1957 Spor.

League participations
 TFF First League: 1987–88, 1990–94, 1996–97
 TFF Second League: 1984–87, 1988–90, 1997–01, 2004–07, 2011–13
 TFF Third League: 2001–04, 2007–11, 2013-15

External links 
Official website
Ünyespor at TFF.org

References

Football clubs in Turkey
Association football clubs established in 1957
1957 establishments in Turkey